Beyond the Farthest Star is a 2015 film directed by Andrew William Librizzi, based on the novel by Bodie & Brock Thoene.

Cast
 Renee O'Connor as Maurene Wells
 Todd Terry as Adam Wells
Jaren Lewison as Young Adam Wells
 Cherami Leigh as Anne Wells
Emily Stuhler as Young Anne Wells
 Tyler Corie as Stephen Miller
Shane Shuma as Young Stephen Miller
 Shawn Roe as Kyle Tucker
Caden Gibson as Young Kyle Tucker
 William McNamara as Calvin Clayman
 Andrew Prine as Senator John Cutter
 Barry Corbin as Chief Burns
 Lou Beatty Jr. as Harrison
 Jordan Walker Ross as Clifford
 Andrew Sensenig as Holden Bitner
 Benjamin Dane as Jimmy Wilkens
 Jodie Moore as Jackson Tucker
 Gail Cronauer as Joycee Jones
 Selma Pinkard as Margaret Collier
 Stephanie Dunnam as Mrs. Harper
 Brooke Peoples as Susan
 LeeAnne Locken as Candace Cutter
 Sandy Baumann as Mrs. Wells
 Bill Jenkins as Adam's Father
 Garrett Schenek as The Mayor
 John McIntosh as The Principal

References

External links
 
 
 

2015 films
2015 drama films
American drama films
Films shot in Texas
2010s English-language films
2010s American films